Jharan is a village in Dang district, Gujarat, India. It is located in the Subir taluka.

According to the 2011 census, it has a population of 731.

References 

Villages in Dang district, India